Archagonum is a genus of beetles in the family Carabidae, containing the following species:

 Archagonum dichroum (Putzeys, 1880)
 Archagonum hirtum (Raffray, 1886)

References

Platyninae